"A Thousand Stars" is a song written by Eugene Pearson and performed by Kathy Young and the Innocents.  

The song was produced and arranged by James Lee, and was featured on her 1961 album The Sound of Kathy Young.

Background
Sandy Nelson played drums on the record.

Chart performance
"A Thousand Stars" reached #3 on the Billboard Hot 100 and #6 on the R&B chart in 1960.

Other versions
The original version was made by Rivileers in 1954, who enjoyed a short (less than two years) recording career from 1954 to 1955. The Rivileers most stable lineup consisted of neighborhood and high school buds: Eugene Pearson, Milton Edwards, Earl Lennard, Herb Crosby, and Alphonso Delaney.
Billy Fury released a version of the song as a single that reached No. 14 on the UK Singles Chart in January 1961. 
Linda Scott released a version of the song on her 1961 album Starlight, Starbright. 
The Daughters of Eve released a version of the song as the B-side to their 1968 single "Social Tragedy".
Canadian rock band The Guess Who performed the song live in Mobile, Alabama on August 14, 1971.

In media
Billy Fury's re-recorded version was included on the soundtrack to the 1973 film That'll Be the Day.

References

1960 songs
1960 singles
Kathy Young songs
Billy Fury songs
Linda Scott songs
Decca Records singles